Dipterocarpus stellatus is a tree in the family Dipterocarpaceae. The specific epithet stellatus means "star-like", referring to its trichomes.

Description
The bark is pinkish brown.

Distribution and habitat
Dipterocarpus stellatus is endemic to Borneo. Its habitat is mixed dipterocarp forest to  elevation.

Conservation
Dipterocarpus stellatus has been assessed as vulnerable on the IUCN Red List. The species is threatened by land conversion to plantations for agriculture and by logging roads. Mining is considered a threat to the species in Kalimantan.

References

stellatus
Plants described in 1874
Endemic flora of Borneo
Trees of Borneo
Flora of the Borneo lowland rain forests